Richard Britton may refer to:

 Richard Britton (motorcyclist) (1970–2005), motorcycle road racer from Northern Ireland
 Richard Britton (athlete) (born 1976), Grenadian athlete
 Rick Britton, American historian and game publishing executive